Jeff Borowiak (born September 25, 1949) is a former professional tennis player from the United States, who won five singles and three doubles titles during his professional career, reaching a career-high ATP singles ranking of World No. 20 in August 1977.

Personal
Borowiak is also an accomplished musician, mastering the flute and the piano. He was also indirectly involved in the formation of the group Metallica when he invested in his friend and Danish fellow player Torben Ulrich's son band Lars Rocket, which later became Metallica.

Tennis career
Borowiak played number one singles on one of the greatest collegiate tennis team of all time for the UCLA Bruins. Haroon Rahim played number two singles, Jimmy Connors played at number three. Borowiak and Connors were NCAA champions, and Rahim remains the youngest player to represent his country in the Davis Cup competition.

Borowiak was ATP Comeback Player of the Year in 1981.

Borowiak was inducted into the Intercollegiate Tennis Association (ITA) Hall of Fame.

Career finals

Singles: 11 (5 titles – 6 runners-up)

Doubles: 9 (3 titles – 6 runners-up)

References

External links
 
 

1949 births
Living people
American male tennis players
Sportspeople from Berkeley, California
Tennis people from California
Tennis players from Seattle
UCLA Bruins men's tennis players